Belajdi Pusi (born 23 January 1998) is an Albanian football player who plays for Turan Tovuz.

Club career
He made his Albanian First Division debut for Vllaznia B on 4 November 2017 in a game against Besa Kavajë.

References

External links
 
 Profile - FSHF

1998 births
Living people
Footballers from Shkodër
Albanian footballers
Association football forwards
KF Vllaznia Shkodër players
KF Skënderbeu Korçë players
Kategoria Superiore players
Kategoria e Parë players